Alf Chapman (3 February 1875 – 3 August 1948) was an Australian rules footballer who played for the South Melbourne Football Club in the Victorian Football League (VFL).

Notes

External links 

1875 births
1948 deaths
Australian rules footballers from Victoria (Australia)
Sydney Swans players